Francis Bacon (1561–1626) was an English Elizabethan philosopher, statesman and essayist.

Francis Bacon may also refer to:
 Francis Bacon (artist) (1909–1992), Irish-born English figurative painter
 Francis Bacon (cricketer) (1869–1915), English cricketer
 Francis Bacon (American football)
 Francis Bacon (Ipswich MP) (1600–1663), English politician
 Francis Bacon (judge) (1587–1657), English judge
 Francis Thomas Bacon (1904–1992), English engineer who developed the hydrogen-oxygen fuel cell
 Francis T. Bacon, supervising architect of the Illinois Central Railroad system

See also
 Frank Bacon (disambiguation)